Enriko Papa (born 12 March 1993) is an Albanian professional footballer who plays as a midfielder for Liga I club Sepsi OSK on loan from Çaykur Rizespor.

Club career
On 25 July 2015, Papa completed a transfer to Bylis by penning a two-year contract. He was given squad number 63, and during the first part of 2015–16 season he played 16 matches and scored two goals before leaving in January 2016.

On 1 February 2016, Papa joined fellow Kategoria Superiore side Tirana for an undisclosed fee. He signed a one-year contract with the option of a further one year.

On 8 January 2017, Papa joined Teuta by signing until the end of 2016–17 season. He made his debut on the same day in a friendly against Besa, scoring his team's first goal in an eventual 3–1 away win. Papa left the club on 18 July 2017.

On 8 September 2017, Papa joined newly promoted side Lushnja. In the 2017–18 season, Papa played 37 games between league and cup, scoring only once, as Lushnja was relegated back to Kategoria e Parë after only one year and was kicked-out in second round in Albanian Cup.

On 27 June 2018, Papa moved for the first time abroad by signing a one-year contract with an option of renew for the Romanian side Botoșani. He was presented two days later where he joined the team on training.

Career statistics

References

External links
FSHF profile

1993 births
Living people
People from Kuçovë
Albanian footballers
Association football forwards
KF Apolonia Fier players
FK Tomori Berat players
KF Butrinti players
KF Bylis Ballsh players
KF Tirana players
KF Teuta Durrës players
KS Lushnja players
FC Botoșani players
Çaykur Rizespor footballers
Sepsi OSK Sfântu Gheorghe players
Kategoria Superiore players
Kategoria e Parë players
Kategoria e Dytë players
Liga I players
TFF First League players
Albanian expatriate footballers
Expatriate footballers in Romania
Albanian expatriate sportspeople in Romania
Expatriate footballers in Turkey
Albanian expatriate sportspeople in Turkey